Saint Benedict Catholic Voluntary Academy is a Catholic secondary school with academy status in the Darley Abbey district of Derby. The school maintains a Catholic ethos, being the only Catholic secondary school in the City of Derby. 
It educates around 1500 students, with more than 100 teachers, as well as a non-teaching support staff such as Learning Support Assistants and House Administrators.

School history
The school was built on its current site in, after the land had been acquired by the Sisters of Mercy, and St. Philomena's High School for Senior Girls moved from Broadway, where it had been located since 1947. In 1971, St. Philomena's merged with the local St. Mary's Secondary School. The two Catholic secondary schools in Derby - Saint Thomas More and Saint Ralph Sherwin - merged in 1986, to make the current site unique as secondary Catholic education within the city of Derby. The school was named after St. Benedict, and had a logo with a Latin motto, 'Crux Sancti Patris Benedicti' ('the cross of our holy father Benedict'), until the school logo was changed in 2002, to show a more angelic looking version of St. Benedict.

Buildings
The school is split into two bases, North Block and South Block, around five minutes' walk apart. The blocks used to be separate schools. Each houses a variety of resources such as the Sports Hall and Theatre. The larger collection of buildings is at 'South Block', where a library, music suite, sports hall, languages centre and design and technology block have been added since the early 1990s.

Enhanced Resource Base (ERB)
This is a dedicated unit set up for supporting students with a wide range of difficulties such as visual impairment, physical impairment and other learning difficulties. There are adapted computer study/teaching rooms, as well as additional rooms for staff and students to use. The ERB also has input from external specialists in careers and physio advice on a regular basis. The ERB has its own on-site IT Technician to deal with ICT related problems and a Resource Technician to handle enlargements of exam papers and texts. The ERB also has a council made up of representatives from all school years, to deal with issues surrounding the ERB and the school.

North Block
North Block is home to a variety of subjects like Religious Studies, Food Technology, science, Sociology and Humanities. As well as North Block reception which doubles up as the box office for The Robert Ludlam Theatre. The school chapel and the chapel garden may also be found in this building.

Robert Ludlam Theatre
The Robert Ludlam Theatre is a 270-seat venue with a diverse programme of entertainment including dance, drama, art, music, theatre in the round, comedy, films, family Entertainment, rock and pop events, and workshops. It provides a home for many of Derbyshire's amateur production groups.

Lafayette Suite
This multi-functional space is for public speaking,
network events and exhibition galleries. In June the
range of Art and Textiles GCSE and A level examination work
of the school's own pupils filled the gallery. External visitors
flocked to the venue to view the presentations. All
the exhibitions are open to the public during school days
until 4:00 pm, although this is by prior arrangement with
the box office.

South Block
The majority of lessons are taught in the earliest South Block building. It includes a floor dedicated to maths, a floor dedicated to English, and a section dedicated to Art and Design. This building also features a Gym, Dining Room, Cooking Room, Computer Room, Pottery Room and Science Rooms.

A newer building adjacent to south block proper houses the main reception, library, 2 ICT Suites, the IT Technicians' office, Staff Room, Science Room, and Vocational subject rooms used for Lesuire and Tourism studies.

Vocational Centre
The Vocational Centre is the main room used for teaching business studies. The room is a second home for Business teachers and has the business staff room and McAuley office next door.

The Music Block
The department continues to provide lessons for drum kit, brass, woodwind, cello, keyboard, violin, classical guitar, electric guitar, bass guitar and voice. Pupils have taken Associated Board Exams, Trinity Exams and Rock School Exams. Based in the Saint Cecilia Music Suite, the studio is used extensively in school and is also available for hire with technician support. The equipment is scheduled to be updated this year and will then be available again for CD recordings by bands, choirs, individuals, or ensembles.

Sports Hall
Sport is a high priority at Saint Benedict Catholic Voluntary Academy with the
Physical Education Department being staffed by 6 extremely
well qualified teachers.
In May 2006 the department was successful in regaining the
Sportsmark Award made by Sport England. This prestigious
award which runs for 3 year cycles following the original
award made in 1997 and which recognises the excellence
of PE and sport in the school. The facilities include a purpose-built Sports Hall (with 3 badminton courts, basketball, netball and volleyball court), a multi-gym, gymnasium, hard play area for netball and extensive playing fields with football, rugby and hockey
pitches. A 400-metre athletics track is marked out in the summer.

School Council
Saint Benedict has a long tradition of having a pupil voice through its School Council, the school council consists of pupils from all areas of the school and is a fair representation of school. Each house has two house captains and they usually decide that one of those will be part of the school council.

Head Boy and Head Girl
Year 13 students may apply to become part of the Student Leadership Team.  They are then interviewed by senior staff.  A Head Boy and Head Girl are chosen, and lead the Team in various activities, including Takeover Day.

Notable former pupils
 Tracy Shaw, actress (Coronation Street)
 Jack O'Connell, actor (This Is England)
Chris Riggott, Footballer for Derby County and Middlesbrough
 James Tague, Footballer
 Keiran Lee, Pornographic actor
 Michael Socha, Actor
 Lauren Socha, Actor
 Durrell Berry, Footballer
 Luke Gunn, Athlete

References

Educational institutions established in 1986
Catholic secondary schools in the Diocese of Nottingham
Secondary schools in Derby
1986 establishments in England
Academies in Derby
Christianity in Derby